Tommi Kerttula (born 17 April 1975) is a Finnish former ice hockey player. Now he works as the sports manager of Porin Ässät in Liiga.

References 

1975 births
Finnish ice hockey defencemen
People from Hämeenlinna
Sportspeople from Kanta-Häme
Living people